In Greek mythology, Deidamia (Ancient Greek: Δηϊδάμεια Deïdameia) was a princess of Scyros as a daughter of King Lycomedes.

Mythology 
Deidamia was one of King Lycomedes's seven daughters with whom Achilles was concealed. Some versions of this story state that Achilles was hidden in Lycomedes's court as one of the king's daughters, some say as a lady-in-waiting under the name "Pyrrha". The two soon became romantically involved to the point of intimacy. After Odysseus arrived at Lycomedes's palace and exposed Achilles as a young man, the hero decided to join the Trojan War, along with his therapon, Patroclus, leaving behind his wife Deidamia. 

Years later, Deidamia tried to persuade their son, Neoptolemus, not to join his father in the same war, but after the death of Achilles, his father, Neoptolemus went for the Trojan war as the next Aristos Achaion. After the war, she was given in marriage by Neoptolemus to his slave Helenus, son of Priam, whom he had brought to Epirus. Later on, Neoptolemus was eventually killed by Orestes when the son of Agamemnon went mad. 

In some accounts, Achilles and Deidamia had another son, Oneiros (Ὄνειρος). He was killed by Orestes, who didn't recognize him, in Phocis while fighting with him over a place to pitch a tent.

Notes

References 

 Bion of Phlossa, The Greek Bucolic Poets translated by Edmonds, J M. Loeb Classical Library Volume 28. Cambridge, MA, Harvard University Press; London, William Heinemann Ltd. 1912. Online version available at the theoi.com
 Dictys Cretensis, from The Trojan War. The Chronicles of Dictys of Crete and Dares the Phrygian translated by Richard McIlwaine Frazer, Jr. (1931-). Indiana University Press. 1966. Online version at the Topos Text Project.
 Euripides, Andromache with an English translation by David Kovacs. Cambridge. Harvard University Press. 1994. Online version at the Perseus Digital Library. Greek text available from the same website.
 Gaius Julius Hyginus, Fabulae from The Myths of Hyginus translated and edited by Mary Grant. University of Kansas Publications in Humanistic Studies. Online version at the Topos Text Project.
 Pseudo-Apollodorus, The Library with an English Translation by Sir James George Frazer, F.B.A., F.R.S. in 2 Volumes, Cambridge, MA, Harvard University Press; London, William Heinemann Ltd. 1921. Online version at the Perseus Digital Library. Greek text available from the same website.
 Publius Papinius Statius, The Achilleid translated by Mozley, J H. Loeb Classical Library Volumes. Cambridge, MA, Harvard University Press; London, William Heinemann Ltd. 1928. Online version at the theoi.com
 Publius Papinius Statius, The Achilleid. Vol. II. John Henry Mozley. London: William Heinemann; New York: G.P. Putnam's Sons. 1928. Latin text available at the Perseus Digital Library.
 Quintus Smyrnaeus, The Fall of Troy translated by Way. A. S. Loeb Classical Library Volume 19. London: William Heinemann, 1913. Online version at theio.com
 Quintus Smyrnaeus, The Fall of Troy. Arthur S. Way. London: William Heinemann; New York: G.P. Putnam's Sons. 1913. Greek text available at the Perseus Digital Library.

External links
 

Princesses in Greek mythology
Women of the Trojan war
Skyros